The Presentation of Benefices Act 1713 (13 Ann c 13) was an Act of the Parliament of Great Britain.

This Act is chapter 14 in Ruffhead's Edition and 12 Ann Stat 2 c XIV in common printed editions.

The last section was repealed by section 1 of, and the Schedule to, the Statute Law Revision Act 1867.

The whole Act, except sections 9 and 11 was repealed by section 41(2) of, and Schedule 5 to, the Patronage (Benefices) Measure 1986 (No 3), subject to section 40 of that Measure.

Sections 9 and 11 were repealed by section 1(1) of, and Part VIII of Schedule 1 to, the Statute Law (Repeals) Act 1989.

Title
The title, from "and for vesting" to end of title, was repealed by section 1 of, and the Schedule to, the Statute Law Revision Act 1887.

References

Great Britain Acts of Parliament 1713